Lactarius lamprocystidiatus is a member of the large milk-cap genus Lactarius in the order Russulales. Found in Papua New Guinea, it was first described scientifically by Verbeken and Horak in 2000.

See also

List of Lactarius species

References

External links

lamprocystidiatus
Fungi described in 2000
Fungi of New Guinea